Franz Hall is an academic building on the University of Portland campus in Portland, Oregon, United States. Construction on the 78,000-square-foot building was completed in 1995.

References

External links

 

1995 establishments in Oregon
Buildings and structures completed in 1995
Buildings and structures in Portland, Oregon
University of Portland campus